Alexander Inglis (died 1496) was a Scottish cleric and royal clerk. He was the son of one George Inglis and his wife Margeret. At some point in his life he had attended university and obtained a Licentiate in Decrees. In 1477 he became Dean of the diocese of Dunkeld, and in 1480 became Archdeacon of St Andrews. On 17 September 1483, after the death of Bishop James Livingston, he was elected to succeed the latter as Bishop of Dunkeld. Inglis ran into difficulty on 22 October, when the Chancellor of the diocese of Aberdeen, George Brown, was also provided as Bishop of Dunkeld. Inglis was styled Bishop-elect in Scotland until 1485, but on 13 June 1484, Brown had been consecrated at the Papal see. Inglis continued to hold his previous posts as Archdeacon and Dean until his death in 1496.

Notes

References
 Dowden, John, The Bishops of Scotland, ed. J. Maitland Thomson, (Glasgow, 1912)
 Watt, D.E.R., Fasti Ecclesiae Scotinanae Medii Aevi ad annum 1638, 2nd Draft, (St Andrews, 1969)

1496 deaths
Bishops of Dunkeld (non consecrated, titular or doubtful)
Year of birth missing
Clerks
15th-century Scottish Roman Catholic bishops
Comptrollers of Scotland